Edward Francis Harrington (born September 16, 1933) is a senior United States district judge of the United States District Court for the District of Massachusetts.

Early life
Harrington was born in Fall River, Massachusetts. He graduated from Sacred Heart Grammar School in 1947, from B.M.C. Durfee High School in 1951 with high honors. He was the recipient of Durfee High School's Distinguished Alumni Award in 1995. His grandfather, Edward F. Harrington was a member of the Massachusetts House of Representatives. His father, John J. Harrington, taught at B.M.C. Durfee High School for over forty years (1929-1970). His mother, Elizabeth C. (Tolan) Harrington, was a grammar school teacher (1923-1932; 1956-1970). His brother John T. Harrington, M.D. was a nephrologist at Tufts Medical Center and Dean of Tufts University School of Medicine. His brother Daniel T. Harrington, M.D. was a sole practitioner, specializing in gastroenterology in Fall River, Massachusetts. He had served as a medical officer in the United States Navy aboard vessels of the Sixth Fleet.

Harrington graduated in cursu honoris, cum laude with an Artium Baccalaureus from College of the Holy Cross in 1955 and with a Juris Doctor from Boston College Law School in 1960. At Holy Cross, Harrington was a member of the Naval ROTC. At Boston College Law School, he was on the Dean's List and a member of the Law Review. He became a member of the Massachusetts Bar in 1960.

He served on active duty in the United States Navy from 1955 to 1957 on destroyer escorts as the gunnery officer, and was a Lieutenant Junior Grade. He was in the United States Navy Reserve from 1957 to 1972. He was a law clerk to the Honorable Paul C. Reardon, Chief Justice of the Massachusetts Superior Court from 1960 to 1961.

He married Ellen Mary Erisman of Greenfield, Massachusetts on July 27, 1957. They had six children and twenty-three grandchildren. Ellen graduated from the College of New Rochelle in 1955 with a Baccalavrei In Artibus in Sociology and was named to Who's Who in American Colleges and Universities. She attended Fordham University School of Social Work from 1955-1957. She was employed by the Foundling Hospital in New York City, specializing in adoptions, from 1955-1957, and later worked for Catholic Charities in Boston from 1957-1958. She died on October 28, 2014. Ellen and Edward had been married for fifty-seven years. Ellen and Edward's children are: John M. Harrington of Needham, Massachusetts; Mary H. Power of Little Compton, Rhode Island; Katherine H. Pershing of Cohasset, Massachusetts; Elizabeth Carroll of Portsmouth, Rhode Island; Edward P. Harrington of Braintree, Massachusetts; the late William T. Harrington of Hingham, Massachusetts.

Attorney
He was a trial attorney in the Criminal Division of the United States Department of Justice in Washington, D.C. from 1961-65. While at the Department of Justice, Harrington was a member of the special prosecution group conducting the nationwide probe of racketeering in the Teamsters Union. As one of the fifteen members of Robert F. Kennedy's so-called "Hoffa Squad", he investigated illegalities in James Hoffa's Teamsters Union. During the so-called "long hot summer of 1964," Harrington was a member of a select team of attorneys dispatched to the State of Mississippi by Attorney General Robert Kennedy to protect the civil rights workers who were conducting "freedom schools" in voter registration there. During this assignment, he was involved in the grand jury investigation of the murders of three civil rights workers in Philadelphia, Mississippi during that summer.

He was an Assistant United States Attorney for the District of Massachusetts from 1965 to 1969. In that capacity, he participated in the successful prosecution and appeal of Raymond L.S. Patriarca, the alleged boss of the New England organized crime family, in 1968 for interstate racketeering. The chief government witness in the Patriarca case, Joseph Barboza, was one of the first organized crime figures to break the "code of silence." The security procedures used to protect accomplice witness Barboza formed the basis for the Witness Protection Program, which was formally established by the U.S. Congress in 1970.

The Patriarca Appeal established the "content-specific" rule for the voir-dire questioning of jurors in high profile prejudicial pre-trial publicity cases. See, Patriarca v. United States, 402F.2d314 (1968).

In 1968, Harrington was an advisor to the National Commission on Violence and from 1974 to 1976 was a consultant to the Commission on the National Policy toward Gambling.

In 1969, Harrington became the Deputy Attorney In Charge of the newly-created U.S. Department of Justice's Strike Force against Organized Crime for the New England area and was the Attorney In Charge from 1970 to 1973. During this period, major gangland accomplice witnesses, such as Vincent C. Teresa and John J. Kelley, were developed. Their testimony resulted in the convictions of numerous significant underworld figures. Teresa was the chief witness in 1971 before the Permanent Senate Subcommittee investigating organized criminal securities fraud in the Wall Street brokerage houses. The "Strike Force" installed the first court-authorized wiretap in the District of Massachusetts in 1970.

From 1973 to 1977, Harrington was in private practice in Boston, Massachusetts.

In 1974, he was a candidate for the Democratic Party's nomination for Attorney General of Massachusetts. He was defeated by Francis X. Bellotti in the primary election, where he finished third in a six-person race.

In 1975, he was appointed by Governor Michael S. Dukakis as Chairman of the Alcoholic Beverages Control Commission, in which capacity he served until January 1977.

In 1976, Harrington was the Massachusetts Co-Chairman of the Sargent Shriver Campaign for President.

In August 1977, Harrington was appointed by President Carter as the United States Attorney for the District of Massachusetts. During his term, the United States Attorney's Office successfully prosecuted members of the Boston School Committee and initiated grand jury investigations into corruption in Boston City Hall, resulting in the conviction of several municipal political figures. The Office also assisted the Ward Commission, which had been established by the State Legislature, in its probe of corruption in the awarding of state construction contracts and its reform of the awarding process. The Office's investigation resulted in the conviction of a member of the State Senate. See, In Re United States, Petitioner 666Fed.2d690 (1st Cir. 1981), a Petition for a Writ of Mandamus filed by the United States seeking the Court of Appeals to order the trial judge to recuse himself from the case. Petition was denied. However, a new trial judge was reassigned to the case upon remand to the District Court. During his term as U.S. Attorney, five members of the notorious "Winter Hill Gang" were convicted in the so-called "Horse Race Fix" case of 1979, including its leader, Howie Winter. The Office supervised the planting of the court-authorized "bugging" of the headquarters of the Boston organized crime family in 1980, which resulted in the successful prosecution and demise of the Angiulo organized criminal organization. James "Whitey" Bulger was one of the confidential informants supporting the affidavit submitted to the Court.

The U.S. Attorney's Office was involved in the landmark Turkette case in which the U.S. Supreme Court in 1981 construed the term "enterprise" in the RICO statute to include illegal, as well as legal, enterprises.

As U.S. Attorney, he served as a member of the United States Attorney General's Advisory Committee of United States Attorneys from 1977 to 1980, and coordinated the security arrangements for Pope John Paul II's visit to Boston in 1979. Harrington left the U.S. Attorney's Office in November 1981, and entered the private practice of law with Sheridan, Garrahan and Lander with offices in Framingham, Massachusetts, where he was engaged in trial practice.

In 1983 and 1984, he was engaged in the "Barczak controversy" - the public debate over the State Attorney General's investigation of Governor King's Revenue Department during the 1982 gubernatorial primary campaign between former Governor Dukakis and Governor King. He believed Barczak's charge of "widespread corruption" in the Department to have been politically motivated and never established. The "Barczak affair" induced him to run for Attorney General in 1986.

In 1986, he was the Republican Party's candidate for Attorney General of Massachusetts, but he lost in the general election to Democrat James Shannon, 55% to 45%.

In 2002, Harrington testified for the defense in the federal RICO trial of FBI agent John J. Connolly, and again in 2008 in the Florida state murder trial of Connolly, who was convicted of second degree murder for assisting James "Whitey" Bulger. In both cases, Harrington's testimony related to Connolly's contribution to the decimation of the New England Mafia.

Federal judicial service

On September 18, 1987, Harrington was nominated by President Ronald Reagan to a seat on the United States District Court for the District of Massachusetts vacated by Judge Andrew Augustine Caffrey. Harrington was confirmed by the United States Senate on February 19, 1988 and received his commission on February 22, 1988. He assumed senior status on March 1, 2001. He was a member of the Judicial Conference of the United States Committee on the Administration of the Bankruptcy System from 1992 to 1999 and again from 2005 to 2011.

Harrington helped shape the novel "fraud on the market" doctrine in security fraud cases, adopted the controversial use of "repressed memory" in sexual abuse cases, formulated the scholastic standards required of learning-disabled students in private schools, required standards for public school teachers and due diligence for federal regulators of the fishing industry, fashioned discovery rules for electronic documents, and upheld the supremacy of the cell-phone tower statute over local zoning regulations.

He participated in many major patent cases involving significant inventions in the medical, electronic, and communication fields, and applied the anti-trust theory to "buy-out" companies’ conspiring to depress the value of corporations intended to be acquired. His opinions in McGuire v. Reilly resolved the contentious confrontations between anti-abortion protesters and women's health clinic employees outside a Brookline clinic by imposing on equal protection grounds the same counseling restrictions on both adversaries.

Harrington was an early critic of the mandatory Sentencing Commission Guidelines, criticizing them for their inflexibility and severity. See, United States v. Snyder, 954F.Supp.19 (1997). As Senior Judge, he declined to hear criminal cases based on his conviction that the Guidelines infringed the sentencing judge's traditional discretion. See, United States v. Sidhom, 144F.Supp.2d.41 (2001). The United States Supreme Court ultimately rendered the Guidelines discretionary, rather than mandatory, and he resumed trying criminal cases. His article "The Metaphorical Wall" on the separation of Church and State was published in America, the national Jesuit magazine, on January 17, 2005. Its theme was that the First Amendment is a prohibition against government, not religion, and fully protects religious exercise and speech.

Harrington served as both U.S. Attorney and U.S. District Judge for the federal District of Massachusetts, a distinction held by only six other individuals since the District was established in 1789.

Since 2015, Harrington has been conducting mediation hearings in the District Court's ADR Program.

He was presented with the 2019 Edward Bennett Williams '41 Lifetime Achievement Award] by the Holy Cross Lawyers Association for distinguished service to the legal profession and devotion to the College.

The Proceedings for the Presentation of his Portrait were reported in 261F.Supp.2dXXXIX (2003).

Personal Reflections

"Feelings sparked by public controversies flicker and die when one leaves the arena and goes on the bench. The judicial branch of government is a sanctum for quiet thought and dispassionate reflection, far and away from the contentions of the past. My office, as well as my conscience, requires that I afford all parties appearing before me a fair and impartial hearing in accordance with the law."

He had a simple judicial philosophy: "I had no agenda other than to try to resolve disputes justly and expeditiously under established principles of law."

"My practice was to exercise judicial restraint by strictly construing the language of the law, according to its meaning and purpose; by adhering to precedent; and by deferring to the political branches of government with respect for the separation of powers."

"A judge should always be acutely conscious that judicial power is vested in the office, and not in himself, and that he occupies the office for a brief time only."

"A judge is like an umpire: a neutral arbiter, fair and impartial; controls the proceedings, but remains inconspicuous; and seeks due process and a just result for the parties (players). A case is conducted by the judge in the interest of the parties, and not for the convenience of the court."

"The purpose of the law lies less in subtle thought and rhetorical eloquence than in achieving fair and honest conduct, conduct which respects the equal rights of all persons."

"Law delineates the boundary between the exercise of power and the exercise of individual rights. Power without law is despotism; rights without law is anarchy. Law maintains the balance between repression and license, that is ordered liberty."

"A person lives in society and society must be governed to maintain order and to protect the rights of the people. Law defines governmental power and, thus, enlarges personal rights; law prescribes personal rights and, thus, limits governmental power. Liberty and law are but two sides of the same coin. Persons are able to exercise their personal rights seeking to live a free, responsible and full life in society only under law."

"Morality is the jurisprudential foundation of the law. Morality is reason reflecting on human nature and directing one's conduct in accordance with human nature's dictate to perfect oneself as a rational human person in society by seeking truth and virtue, sanity and balance, honesty and fairness. To perform one's natural obligations brings personal fulfillment."

"Law is founded on morality for a person has natural obligations to self, family and society, which are inscribed in human nature and known by reason. To fail to comply with the natural law brings disorder in one's life."

"We should seek the truth, follow our conscience, and develop our potential so as to make a contribution to society, which provides us the resources necessary to live a full live."

"A full life consists of a close family, good friends, a worthy task to spend the day, a good book to enrich the mind, an avocation to refresh the spirit, and faith in God's mercy."

"Life, like the movies, is a collaborative endeavor. My wife Ellen was my collaborator in every aspect of our lives together. She had a serene manner, a generous heart, inner strength, sound judgement, and a deep faith. She was accomplished in the many projects she undertook, including gardening, interior design and decoration, furniture refinishing and reupholstering, sewing, fashion, finances and investments. She created an environment of beauty and joy. To her children she remains their guide and an inspiration. Grief over her loss has not been cured by time, and an awful void remains in my life. I never conceived that the pain of loneliness would be so intense. My children have alleviated the pain of loss by including me in their lives."

"In addition to raising her family of six children, Ellen was actively involved in her community of Needham, where she lived for over forty years. Some of her activities were: St. Joseph's Women's Guild president, altar society, and annual bazaar committee; League of Women's voters, Postcomers officer, political campaigner, C.C.D. teacher, library aide, cub and girl scout leader, meals-on-wheels volunteer, book club and bridge club member. In looking back, I am amazed at how much of herself Ellen gave for others. In her social and charitable activities Ellen was committed, cooperative, genuine, effective, and selfless."

"Ellen's Greenfield High School yearbook captures the total person as she truly was: 'most popular;' 'done most for G.H.S.;' 'best school spirit;' 'best all around;' as well as being class treasurer and a cheerleader."

"My youngest child, Billy, died on August 25, 2021, at age 54, while playing softball. He was like his mother: intelligent, competent, kind, even-tempered and good-natured, humble, and authentic. He was a loving husband and father and cherished by his siblings, a brilliant lawyer, a hard worker, an avid sports fan, an active outdoorsman, and beloved by his community of Hingham. He was a true gentleman. He lived a short, but full life - a success in his family and in his profession. I am devastated by the sudden and premature death of my son, Billy."

References

Sources
 
Confirmation hearings on federal appointments : hearings before the Committee on the Judiciary, United States Senate, One Hundredth Congress, first session, on confirmation of appointments to the federal judiciary and the Department of Justice pt.4 (1988) 

1933 births
Living people
College of the Holy Cross alumni
Boston College Law School alumni
United States Attorneys for the District of Massachusetts
Judges of the United States District Court for the District of Massachusetts
United States district court judges appointed by Ronald Reagan
20th-century American judges
Massachusetts Democrats
Massachusetts Republicans
People from Needham, Massachusetts
United States Navy officers
Assistant United States Attorneys
21st-century American judges
B.M.C. Durfee High School alumni